Corinne Mitchell (1914-1993) was an American painter and educator. She was the first African American to have a solo exhibit at the National Museum of Women in the Arts.

Biography
Mitchell née Howard was born on March 10, 1914, in Baskerville, Virginia, the eleventh of eighteen children. She attended St Paul's College earning an associate degree in 1935, Virginia State College earning a B.A in 1951, and George Washington University earning an MA in 1965.

In 1938 she married William E. Mitchell. The couple located in Washington, D.C. in 1956. Mitchell went on to teach at Montgomery County Schools until 1982. Through her civil rights activities Mitchell was acquainted with fellow Washington-area artists Loïs Mailou Jones, Delilah Pierce, and Alma Thomas.

In 1992 the National Museum of Women in the Arts held a solo exhibition Glimpse of Joy, which was NMWA's first solo exhibition of an African American woman's art. In 1993 the Charles Sumner School held a retrospective show of 29 of her paintings. Her work is in The Johnson Collection, Spartanburg, South Carolina.

Mitchell died April 21, 1993, in Washington, D.C.

References

1914 births
1993 deaths
African-American painters
African-American women artists
20th-century African-American women
20th-century African-American artists